The Passage Pommeraye is a small shopping arcade in central Nantes, France, named after its property developer, Louis Pommeraye. Construction started at the end of 1840 and was completed on 4 July 1843. The Passage Pommeraye is a passage between two streets, the rue Santeuil and rue de la Fosse, with one 9.40 m higher than the other. Midway, there is a flight of steps and the mall then continues on another floor. Two architects, Jean-Baptiste Buron and Hippolyte Durand Gasselin, contributed to its design, which is very elaborate and includes renaissance style sculptures.

The Passage Pommeraye has been classified as a historic monument since 1976.

Movies

The Passage Pommeraye can be seen in several movies : 
Lola by director Jacques Demy.
Une chambre en ville by director Jacques Demy.
Les Parapluies de Cherbourg by director Jacques Demy.
La reine blanche by director Jean-Loup Huber.
Jacquot de Nantes by director Agnès Varda (Jacques Demy's wife]

Sources
 https://archive.today/20120910110520/http://www.nantes44.com/pommeray.htm (in French), accessed on 10 November 2005

Photos

Nantes
Shopping arcades in France
Shopping malls established in 1843
1843 establishments in France